Bettina L. Love is an American author and academic. She is the William F. Russell Professor at Teachers College, Columbia University, where she has been instrumental in establishing abolitionist teaching in schools. According to Love, abolitionist teaching refers to restoring humanity for children in schools. Love also advocates eliminating the billion-dollar industry of standardized testing.

Early life and education
Love was born in Rochester, New York. Love graduated with a B.S. in Liberal Studies from the University of Pittsburgh in 2001. She obtained her MEd in Elementary Education also from the University of Pittsburgh in 2002. She received her PhD in Educational Policy Studies from Georgia State University in 2008.

Career
Love's academic positions include teaching at Northern Kentucky University from 2009 to 2011. From 2011 to 2015, she was assistant professor in the Department of Educational Theory & Practice at the University of Georgia. Since 2015, she has been an associate professor of education at the University of Georgia.
Her writing, research, teaching, and activism meet at the intersection of race, education, abolition, and black joy. Love is concerned with how educators working with parents and communities can build communal, civically engaged schools rooted in abolitionist teaching with the goal of intersectional social justice for equitable classrooms that love and affirm black and brown children. In 2020, Love co-founded the Abolitionist Teaching Network (ATN) to develop and support teachers and parents to fight injustice within their schools and communities. In 2020, Love was also named a member of the Old 4th Ward Economic Security Task Force with the Atlanta City Council.

In 2014, she was invited to the White House Research Conference on Girls to discuss her work focused on the lives of black girls. For her work in the field of hip hop education, in 2016, Love was named the Nasir Jones Hiphop Fellow at the Hutchins Center for African and African American Research at Harvard University. In April 2017, Love participated in a one-on-one public lecture with bell hooks focused on liberatory education. In 2018, the Georgia House of Representatives presented Love with a resolution for her impact on the field of education. She has also provided commentary for various news outlets including NPR, Ed Week, The Guardian, and the Atlanta Journal Constitution.

She is the author of the books We Want to Do More Than Survive: Abolitionist Teaching and the Pursuit of Educational Freedom and Hip Hop’s Li’l Sistas Speak: Negotiating Hip Hop Identities and Politics in the New South. Her work has appeared in numerous books and journals, including the English Journal, Urban Education, The Urban Review, and the Journal of LGBT Youth.

Awards and honors
 2016 Nasir Jones Fellowship at the W. E. B. Du Bois Research Institute at the Hutchins
 Center for African & African American Research at Harvard University 
 2018 Georgia House of Representatives Resolution
 2018 University of Pittsburgh Visiting Scholar 
 2018 University of Houston-Downtown Scholar-in-Residence 
 2018 40 under 40 Georgia State University Alumni Award 
 2019 Rhodes College Scholar-in-Residence

Videos
 Hip hop, grit, and academic success at TEDxUGA
 We Want to Do More Than Survive. University of Georgia Professor Bettina Love talks about her book, We Want to Do More Than Survive: Abolitionist Teaching and the Pursuit of Educational Freedom, in which she shares her thoughts on how educators, parents, and community leaders can advocate for “education freedom” for students through civic engagement and activism.

Selected works

Books (author)
 Hip Hop's Li'l Sistas Speak: Negotiating Hip Hop Identities and Politics in the New South. (Peter Lang, 2012). 
 We Want To Do More Than Survive: Abolitionist Teaching and the Pursuit of Educational Freedom. (Beacon Press, 2019).

Articles
 "‘I See Trayvon Martin’: What Teachers Can Learn from the Tragic Death of a Young Black Male." The Urban Review, vol. 46, no. 2, Springer Science and Business Media LLC, 2013, pp. 292–306, doi:10.1007/s11256-013-0260-7. 
 "Urban Storytelling: How Storyboarding, Moviemaking, and Hip-Hop-Based Education Can Promote Students’ Critical Voice.” The English Journal, High school edition, vol. 103, no. 5, National Council of Teachers of English, May 2014, pp. 53–58. 
 "A Ratchet Lens: Black Queer Youth, Agency, Hip Hop, and the Black Ratchet Imagination.” Educational Researcher, vol. 46, no. 9, SAGE Publications, Dec. 2017, pp. 539–47, doi:10.3102/0013189X17736520. 
 "Dear White Teachers: You Can't Love Your Black Students If You Don't Know Them". Education Week, March 18, 2019.

References

External links
 Interview with the ASCD on the meaning of Abolitionist Education

21st-century American educators
African-American educators
African-American women academics
American women academics
African-American academics
Black studies scholars
African-American non-fiction writers
University of Pittsburgh alumni
American non-fiction writers
American women non-fiction writers
University of Georgia faculty
Northern Kentucky University faculty
Georgia State University alumni
Living people
Year of birth missing (living people)
21st-century American women educators
21st-century African-American women
21st-century African-American people